Aria: The Opera Album is Andrea Bocelli's fourth studio album, released in April 1998.

Bocelli received the ECHO Klassik, for "Best selling classical album" for the album in 1998.

Track listing 
1. "Questa o quella", from Verdi's Rigoletto (1:47)

2. "Che gelida manina", from Puccini's La bohème (4:21)

3. "Recondita armonia", from Puccini's Tosca (2:59)

4. "E lucevan le stelle", from Puccini's Tosca (2:53)

5. "Addio, fiorito asil", from Puccini's Madama Butterfly (1:50)

6. "Come un bel dì di maggio", from Giordano's Andrea Chénier (3:18)

7. "A te, o cara", from Bellini's I Puritani (3:05)

8. "Di rigori armato il seno", from Strauss's Der Rosenkavalier (2:10)

9. "Amor ti vieta", from Giordano's Fedora (1:51)

10. "Ch'ella mì creda libero", from Puccini's La fanciulla del West (2:01)

11. "Cielo e mar!", from  Ponchielli's La Gioconda (4:35)

12. "La dolcissima effigie", from Cilea's Adriana Lecouvreur (2:13)

13. "Musetta!...Testa adorata", from Leoncavallo's La bohème (3:06)

14. "Tombe degli avi miei - Fra poco a me ricovero", from Donizetti's Lucia di Lammermoor (6:53)

15. "Pourquoi me réveiller", from Massenet's Werther (3:06)

16. "La fleur que tu m'avais jetée", from Bizet's Carmen (4:20)

17. "Pour mon âme", from Donizetti's La fille du régiment (2:15)

Bonus Tracks:

18. "Di Quella Pira", from Verdi's II trovatore (3:22)

19. "C'était le soir... Au fond du temple Saint", from Bizet's Les pêcheurs de perles (6:17)

Charts

Year-end charts

Certifications

References 

1998 classical albums
Andrea Bocelli albums
Opera recordings